Andreas Schlütter (born 17 August 1972) is a German cross-country skier who has been competing since 1993. He won two medals in the 4 × 10 km relay at the Winter Olympics with a silver in 2006 and a bronze in 2002. Schlütter's best individual Olympic finish was fourth in the 50 km event in 2002.

Schlütter also has three 4 × 10 km relay medals at the FIS Nordic World Ski Championships, earning two silvers (2003, 2005) and one bronze (2001). His best individual finishes at the World Championships were in 2003 with fifth-place finishes in the 15 km and 30 km events.

In April 2014, Schlütter was appointed as Sporting Director of cross-country skiing of the German Ski Association.

Cross-country skiing results
All results are sourced from the International Ski Federation (FIS).

Olympic Games
 2 medals – (1 silver, 1 bronze)

World Championships
 3 medals – (2 silver, 1 bronze)

World Cup

Season standings

Individual podiums

2 podiums

Team podiums
 3 victories – (3 ) 
 8 podiums – (7 , 1 )

References

External links 
  
 
 
 

German male cross-country skiers
Olympic cross-country skiers of Germany
Cross-country skiers at the 1998 Winter Olympics
Cross-country skiers at the 2002 Winter Olympics
Cross-country skiers at the 2006 Winter Olympics
1972 births
Living people
Olympic silver medalists for Germany
Olympic bronze medalists for Germany
Olympic medalists in cross-country skiing
FIS Nordic World Ski Championships medalists in cross-country skiing
Medalists at the 2006 Winter Olympics
Medalists at the 2002 Winter Olympics
People from Suhl
Sportspeople from Thuringia
21st-century German people